Anzaze was a queen of the Elymais (a Parthian vassal kingdom in what is now Iran). She appears on coins together with king  Kamnaskires III (about 82/81 BC to  75. BC following dates on the coins). They perhaps ruled together as on the coins she is called βασιλίσσης (the Genitive case of queen - βασίλισσα [basílissa]). Furthermore it was not common on Ancient coins that king and queens appear together, again supporting her special status.

Literature 
D. T. Potts: The Archaeology of Elam, Cambridge University Press, Cambridge 1999, 399 

1st-century BC women rulers
Arsacid dynasty of Elymais
Ancient queens regnant